Linfen is a prefecture-level city in the southwest of Shanxi province, China, bordering Shaanxi province to the west. It is situated along the banks of the Fen River. The GDP of Linfen ranked second in Shanxi Province. It was known as Pingyang during the Spring and Autumn period. In 2006, the American Blacksmith Institute listed Linfen as one of the ten most polluted cities in the world.

Prior to 1978, Linfen was famous for its spring water, greenery and rich agriculture and therefore nicknamed "The Modern Fruit and Flower Town". Since then it has been developing into a main industrial center for coal mining, which has significantly damaged the city's environment, air quality, farming, health and its previous status as a green village.

Name

Linfen is named for the Fen River. Its former names include Jin, Jinzhou, and Pingyang.

History

Chinese archeologists have claimed that legendary ruler Yao's capital was located in Linfen, a confirmation of local legend responsible for the name of the city's Yaodu District. So, Linfen city is the earliest capital of China.

The area was the center of the marchland and duchy of Jin, named for the Jin River  The duchy collapsed in the  but gave its name to a Chinese princely title used as the dynastic name of the Sima clan.  was centered on the town, which took its name as Jin and Jinzhou. Later, it was renamed , which was also adapted as the name for its chief town. The Xiongnu emperor of Former Zhao Liu Cong made Pingyang his residence in the fourth century.  "He kept court at Pingyang in [Shanxi] and ruled over central and southern [Shanxi], over [Shaanxi] (except for the Han basin), northern [Henan] (except for Kaifeng), southern [Hebei], and northern [Shandong]." In the 10th century, the city's walls were considered "fortified beyond approach".

In the 1980s, Linfen was nicknamed "The Modern Fruit and Flower Town".

Geography 
Linfen is located in the southwestern part of Shanxi, on the lower reaches of the Fen River, bounded by Changzhi and Jincheng to the east, the Yellow River to the west (which also forms the border with Shaanxi), Jinzhong and Lüliang to the north, and Yuncheng to the south. The prefecture ranges in latitude from 35° 23′ N to 36° 37′ N, spanning , and in longitude from 110° 22′ E to 112° 34′ E, spanning .

Within its borders Linfen City has a variety of topographical features. It is characterised as having a "U" shape, with its mountains, covering 29.2% of the prefectural area, on all four cardinal directions, a basin, the Linfen Basin, covering 19.4%, in the middle, and intervening hills, covering 51.4%, in between. In the east, from north to south, are Mount Huo and the Zhongtiao Mountains; in the west are the Lüliang Mountains, with elevations mostly above . Important rivers in the area include the Yellow, Fen, Xinshui, Qin, Hui, E, and Qingshui Rivers.

The whole prefecture-level city features a great variety of terrain. The city itself sits in a basin, which aggravates the pollution.

Climate 
Linfen has a continental, monsoon-influenced semi-arid climate (Köppen BSk), with moderately cold, but dry winters, and hot, somewhat humid summers. The frost-free period lasts on average 190 days per year.

Pollution
China's rapid industrialization and urbanization beginning in the 1990s (see opening of China) led to increased energy demand causing a dramatic increase in the price of coal. This led to a rapid expansion of loosely regulated private mines. Mining, cooking, smelting and other heavy industries which developed around the city have led to catastrophic environmental damage.

In 2006, the Blacksmith Institute included Linfen in its annual "10 worst" report, calling the city the most polluted city in China.  It has also been listed as one of the world's ten dirtiest cities by the Popular Science website. The city has ranked at the bottom of the World Bank's air quality rankings.

From its low point, in 2004, with only fifteen days out of the year with an acceptable level of air pollution, the environmental situation has improved. After a series of negative reports on the extreme level of pollution in the city, efforts were made to clean up Linfen. Substandard mines were closed.  Coal trucks were kept from entering the city, resulting in much less coal dust. The city has also switched much of its heating source from coal to gas. 197 large coal-fired boilers and more than 600 smaller boilers were decommissioned. As of 2007, 85% of population used natural gas rather than coal for their heating. The State Environmental Protection Agency (SEPA) has forced many of the less-efficient smaller factories to close and enforced stricter standards for larger factories including mandating the installation of sulfur scrubbers.

Since 2006, the government has taken a series of measures to modify industrial structure and economic development mode. Relevant policies was issued such as emission thresholds of industrial pollution. Over the last few years the Ministry of Environmental Protection has been closely monitoring Linfen's environment conditions. While the China Youth Daily reported in 2014 that Linfen was experiencing the great change from the "most polluted city" to "model city of environmental protection", other sources suggest that little progress has been made in combating pollution. In 2018, the Chinese government openly criticized the city's failure to meet pollution targets, and a 2019 report by the Chinese Ministry of Ecology and Environment found that the city's air pollution was the worst among the 168 cities the ministry monitored. Following the report, the city's government ordered further pollution controls for the city's industry.

Administrative divisions
The prefecture-level city of Linfen is divided in one district, two cities and fourteen counties. The information here presented uses the metric system and data from 2010 Census.

Tourism

Linfen prefecture is home to several notable tourist attractions including the Hukou Waterfall which is the largest waterfall on the Yellow River and the second largest in China.

Other attractions are mostly located in Hongtong county. Most notable among these is Guangsheng Temple, built in 147 CE. Located in the upper Guangsheng temple is the Feihong Pagoda, the largest and best preserved glazed Chinese pagoda. Also in Hongtong county is the Susan Prison, a restored Ming dynasty prison made famous by the Peking opera play . It is Chinese oldest surviving prison. Dahuaishu Ancestor Memorial Garden is a major shown for the mandatory population migration (aka Hongwu great migration, 洪武大移民) in early Ming Dynasty.

Demographics 
Linfen recorded a population of approximately 4,508,400 people as of 2019, an increase of 80,100 from 2018. The city reported 2,414,700 urban residents, and 2,093,700 rural residents, giving the city a 53.56% urbanization rate. There are 28 ethnic minorities in Linfen with a population exceeding 10,000 people: the Hui, the Manchu, the Tujia, Mongols, the Miao, the Zhuang, Koreans, the Yi, the Buyi, the Bai, Uyghurs, the Mulao, the She, Tibetans, the Li, the Dong, the Yao, Tajiks, the Gelao, the Daur, the Lahu, the Wa, the Hani, the Tu, the Xibo, the Lisu, the Qiang, and the Jingpo.

Economy
As of 2019, the city reported a GDP of 145.26 billion Renminbi. Linfen's primary sector makes up 7.1% of the city's GDP, the secondary sector contributes 43.3% of the city's GDP, and the tertiary sector makes up 49.6% of the city's GDP.

Industry 
Linfen has rich mineral resources including coal, iron ore, copper, and lead. Hedong Coal Field, Huoxi Coal Field and Qinshui Coal Field together comprise 62.9 billion tons of coal reserves. Iron ore reserves exceed 420 million tons. Coal mining and dressing, coking, metallurgy, non-ferrous metal smelting, and chemicals are the principle industries.

After a World Bank report in 2006 called Linfen "the most polluted city in the world", the local government began closing a number of mines and factories, costing the city's economy $300 million in 2007 alone. A number of industries also refitted their facilities to track and reduce pollution. The city's economy stagnated in the following years.

Transportation

Air 
Linfen Yaodu Airport, in Yaodu district, was built in 1958 and closed in 1965. The airport has been under renovation since September 2010 and started operation in January 2016.

Railway

Linfen railway station, in Yaodu district, was built in 1935 on the important southern Tongpu railway.

Linfen West railway station, in Yaodu district, was built in 2014. It is on the Datong–Xi'an high-speed railway. From this station, passengers can go to Beijing, Xi'an, Taiyuan and Shijiazhuang directly.

Road 

 China National Highway 108
 China National Highway 309
 G5 Beijing–Kunming Expressway
 G22 Qingdao–Lanzhou Expressway

Education 
 Shanxi Normal University

References

External links
Official website of Linfen Government
LinFen Photo Essay
A canary in the Chinese coal mine (published 2007-03-02; accessed 2007-04-01)
BBC article Blacksmith Institute list

 
Cities in Shanxi
Prefecture-level divisions of Shanxi